The adrenal cortex is the outer region and also the largest part of an adrenal gland. It is divided into three separate zones: zona glomerulosa, zona fasciculata and zona reticularis. Each zone is responsible for producing specific hormones. It is also a secondary site of androgen synthesis.

Layers

The adrenal cortex comprises three main zones, or layers that are regulated by distinct hormones as noted below.  This anatomic zonation can be appreciated at the microscopic level, where each zone can be recognized and distinguished from one another based on structural and anatomic characteristics.

Zona glomerulosa
The outermost layer, the zona glomerulosa is the main site for the production of aldosterone, a mineralocorticoid. The synthesis and secretion of aldosterone are mainly regulated by the renin–angiotensin–aldosterone system. The zona glomerulosa cells express a specific enzyme aldosterone synthase (also known as CYP11B2). Aldosterone is largely responsible for the long-term regulation of blood pressure. Aldosterone's effects are on the distal convoluted tubule and collecting duct of the kidney where it causes increased reabsorption of sodium and increased excretion of both potassium (by principal cells) and hydrogen ions (by intercalated cells of the collecting duct). Sodium retention is also a response of the distal colon, and sweat glands to aldosterone receptor stimulation. Although sustained production of aldosterone requires persistent calcium entry through low-voltage activated Ca2+ channels, isolated zona glomerulosa cells are considered nonexcitable, with recorded membrane voltages that are too hyperpolarized to permit Ca2+ channels entry.

The secretion of aldosterone is also stimulated by adrenocorticotropic hormone (ACTH).

The cells of the zona glomerulosa don't express 11β-hydroxylase and 17α-hydroxylase. This is the reason zona glomerulosa can't synthesize cortisol, corticosterone or sex hormones (androgens).
The expression of neuron-specific proteins in the zona glomerulosa cells of human adrenocortical tissues has been predicted and reported by several authors and it was suggested that the expression of proteins like the neuronal cell adhesion molecule (NCAM) in the cells of the zona glomerulosa reflects the regenerative feature of these cells, which would lose NCAM immunoreactivity after moving to the zona fasciculata. However, together with other data on neuroendocrine properties of zona glomerulosa cells, NCAM expression may reflect a neuroendocrine differentiation of these cells.

Zona fasciculata
Situated between the glomerulosa and reticularis, the cells of the zona fasciculata synthesize and secrete glucocorticoids (such as 11-deoxycorticosterone, corticosterone, and cortisol), as well as small amounts of adrenal androgens and estrogens. The zona fasciculata has more 3β-hydroxysteroid dehydrogenase activity than the zona reticularis. Therefore, the zona fasciculata makes more 11-deoxycorticosterone, corticosterone, and cortisol. The major hormone that stimulates cortisol secretion in humans is the ACTH that is released from the anterior pituitary. It has been shown that the steroidogenic capacity of the zona fasciculata increases during illness in infants.

Zona reticularis
The inner most cortical layer, the zona reticularis produces adrenal androgens, as well as small amounts of estrogens and some glucocorticoids. The zona reticularis has more of the cofactors required for the 17,20-lyase activity of 17α-hydroxylase than zona fasciculata. Therefore, the zona reticularis makes more androgens, mainly dehydroepiandrosterone (DHEA), DHEA sulfate (DHEA-S), and androstenedione (the precursor to testosterone) in humans. The secretion of DHEAS is also stimulated by ACTH.

Hormone synthesis

The precursor of steroids synthesized in the adrenal cortex is cholesterol that is stored in vesicles. Cholesterol can be synthesized de novo in the adrenal cortex. Yet, the major source of cholesterol appears to be cholesterol that is taken up with circulating lipoproteins.

The steps up to this point occur in many steroid-producing tissues. Subsequent steps to generate aldosterone and cortisol, however, primarily occur in the adrenal cortex:
 Progesterone → (hydroxylation at C21) → 11-Deoxycorticosterone → (two further hydroxylations at C11 and C18) → Aldosterone
 Progesterone → (hydroxylation at C17) → 17-alpha-hydroxyprogesterone → (hydroxylation at C21) → 11-Deoxycortisol → (hydroxylation at C11) → Cortisol

Production
The adrenal cortex produces a number of different corticosteroid hormones.

Mineralocorticoids

The primary mineralocorticoid, aldosterone, is produced in the adrenocortical zona glomerulosa by the action of the enzyme aldosterone synthase (also known as CYP11B2). Aldosterone is largely responsible for the long-term regulation of blood pressure. Aldosterone effects on the distal convoluted tubule and collecting duct of the kidney where it causes increased reabsorption of sodium and increased excretion of both potassium (by principal cells) and hydrogen ions (by intercalated cells of the collecting duct). Sodium retention is also a response of the distal colon, and sweat glands to aldosterone receptor stimulation. Although sustained production of aldosterone requires persistent calcium entry through low-voltage activated Ca2+ channels, isolated zona glomerulosa cells are considered nonexcitable, with recorded membrane voltages that are too hyperpolarized to permit Ca2+ channels entry.

Glucocorticoids

Glucocorticoids are produced mainly in the zona fasciculata. The primary glucocorticoid released by the adrenal gland is cortisol in humans and corticosterone in many other animals. Its secretion is regulated by the hormone ACTH from the anterior pituitary.

Androgens

They are produced mainly in the zona reticularis. The most important androgens include:
 Testosterone: a hormone with a wide variety of effects, ranging from enhancing muscle mass and stimulation of cell growth to the development of the secondary sex characteristics.
 Dihydrotestosterone (DHT): a metabolite of testosterone, and a more potent androgen than testosterone in that it binds more strongly to androgen receptors.
 Androstenedione (Andro): an androgenic steroid produced by the testes, adrenal cortex, and ovaries. While androstenediones are converted metabolically to testosterone and other androgens, they are also the parent structure of estrone.
 Dehydroepiandrosterone (DHEA): It is the primary precursor of natural estrogens. DHEA is also called dehydroisoandrosterone or dehydroandrosterone.  The reticularis also produces DHEA-sulfate due to the actions of a sulfotransferase, SULT2A1.

Pathology
 Adrenal insufficiency (e.g. due to Addison's disease)
 Cushing's syndrome
 Cushing's disease
 Conn's syndrome
 Adrenocortical carcinoma

See also
 Adrenarche
 Adrenopause

References

External links
  – "Posterior Abdominal Wall: Blood Supply to the Suprarenal Glands"
 
 

Adrenal gland